Darling is a 2007 Swedish drama film directed by Johan Kling, about an irresponsible young woman in central Stockholm who befriends an older man. The film was generally well received by critics.

Cast
  as Eva
 Michael Segerström as Bernard
 Richard Ulfsäter as Micke
 Michael Lindgren as Nico
 Marko Ivkovich as McDonald's chef
 Erica Silfverhielm as Martina
 Henrik Lundström as Mickes friend
 Tanja Lorentzon as Maja

Awards and nominations
The film was awarded the Nordic Film Prize at the Gothenburg Film Festival as well as the Guldbagge Awards for Best Actor (Michael Segerström) and Best Cinematography, at the 43rd Guldbagge Awards. It was also nominated for the Guldbagge Awards for Best Film, Best Director, Best Actress (Michelle Meadows) and Best Screenplay.

References

External links
 
 
 

2007 films
2007 drama films
2000s Swedish films
2000s Swedish-language films
Films set in Stockholm
Films shot in Stockholm
Swedish drama films